Fuxing may refer to:

Fu star (福星), or Fuxing, Chinese deity
Fuxing (train) (复兴号, meaning "Rejuvenation"), China Standardized EMU operated by China Railway High-speed (CRH)
Fuxing Road (disambiguation)
Chinese compound surname (複姓)

Mainland China
Fuxing, Li County, in Li County, Hunan

Taiwan
Fuxing, Changhua (福興鄉), township in Changhua County
Fuxing District, Taoyuan (復興區), aboriginal district in Taoyuan
Fuxing Islet (復興嶼), Lieyu Township, Kinmen County
Fuxing Radio (復興廣播電台), radio station in Taipei

See also
 Fucking (disambiguation)
 Fuqing, a county-level city of Fuzhou in Fujian Province, People's Republic of China